The Jameh Mosque of Damghan  is related to the Abbasid Caliphate-Seljuq dynasty and is located in Damghan.

References

Mosques in Iran
Mosque buildings with domes
National works of Iran
Damghan